The third season of the American comedy television series It's Always Sunny in Philadelphia premiered on FX on September 13, 2007. The season contains 15 episodes and concluded airing on November 15, 2007.

Season synopsis 
The Gang's narcissism spins out of control, as usual. First they decide to do good: Sweet Dee and Mac adopt a baby that was abandoned in a dumpster, Dennis volunteers with environmental rights activists, and everyone in the gang become vigilantes to solve Philadelphia's homeless problem. The gang then hatches several schemes to become famous: Mac, Frank, and Charlie try to be viral video stars by covering the local news while Dennis and Dee seek fame as spoiled, drug-addled club hoppers. Sweet Dee dates a local rapper mistakenly thought to be mentally disabled by Mac and Dennis, the two of whom start a band, but can't quite pinpoint their genre of music—especially when Charlie comes up with a raunchy, disjointed song about a mysterious creature who violates him in his sleep.

The Gang's jealousy and greed come roaring back when they fight over Barbara's inheritance, after she wills the house to Dennis. Dee gets jealous of her high school friend (who lost weight and has a successful career in fashion design) and decides to start her very own sweatshop. The entire gang struggles to compete with a local bar owned by a Korean man who looks like Kim Jong-il, and then decide to sell out by offering Paddy's Pub to a corporate chain. Two members of the gang find themselves on the wrong side of the law due to mistaken identity: Mac is suspected to be a serial killer after becoming distant from the gang and Dennis is mistaken for a registered sex offender after a real sex offender (who looks like a fatter version of Dennis) is released from prison due to overcrowding. Meanwhile, the gang sells some cocaine found in a pair of abandoned stereo speakers, forcing them to turn to crime and prostitution to earn the money back before some local Italian Mafia members “whack” (or kill) them.

Finally, the gang is forced to save themselves from Charlie's mistakes. First, the McPoyles get revenge on the gang for revealing their false molestation charge (from season one's finale "Charlie Got Molested") and inadvertently shooting their brother Doyle (from this season's "The Gang Gets Invincible") after he was invited to the Eagles' training camp by taking all of them hostage in their own bar. Finally, Charlie's illiteracy screws over the gang when he accidentally puts the bar up as a prize for a dance marathon, and all the enemies made throughout the course of the series enter the contest so they can take the bar away from the gang. The gang won't let the bar go without a fight—but not before using dirty tricks on each other.

Cast

Main cast 
 Charlie Day as Charlie Kelly
 Glenn Howerton as Dennis Reynolds / Wendell Albright
 Rob McElhenney as Mac
 Kaitlin Olson as Dee Reynolds
 Danny DeVito as Frank Reynolds

Recurring cast 
 Mary Elizabeth Ellis as The Waitress
 David Hornsby as Matthew "Rickety Cricket" Mara
 Jimmi Simpson as Liam McPoyle
 Nate Mooney as Ryan McPoyle
 Lynne Marie Stewart as Bonnie Kelly
 Sandy Martin as Mrs. Mac

Guest stars 
 Lucy DeVito as Woman
 Artemis Pebdani as Artemis
 Brian Unger as The Lawyer
 Gregory Scott Cummins as Luther Mac
 Stephen Collins as Bruce Mathis
 Sam Witwer as Muscular Guy
 Judy Greer as Ingrid Nelson
 Kyle Davis as Lil' Kevin
 Richard Ruccolo as Corporate Rep
 Brittany Daniel as Carmen
 Tracey Walter as Bum
 Sklar Brothers as Fat Michael and DJ Squirrely D

Episodes

Reception
The third season received positive reviews. On Rotten Tomatoes, it has an approval rating of 90% with an average score of 8 out of 10 based on 20 reviews. The website's critical consensus reads, "It's Always Sunny solidifies into a broader comedy during its third season, with the Gang coming into their own worst selves and the fictionalized Philadelphia they inhabit taking on a kooky life of its own."

Home media

References

External links 

 
 

2007 American television seasons
It's Always Sunny in Philadelphia